The synchronised swimming competitions at the 2017 Southeast Asian Games in Kuala Lumpur took place at National Aquatic Centre, Bukit Jalil, Kuala Lumpur.

The 2017 Games featured competitions in 5 events.

Solo Technical Routine

Solo Free Routine

Duet Technical Routine

Duet Free Routine

Team Free Routine

References

External links
  

R